Sunlit Hills is an unincorporated community and census-designated place (CDP) in Santa Fe County, New Mexico, United States. It was first listed as a CDP prior to the 2020 census.

The CDP is north of the geographic center of Santa Fe County and is bordered to the west by Seton Village, to the northwest by Arroyo Hondo, to the north by Conejo, and to the northeast by Santa Fe Foothills. Interstate 25 forms the eastern border of the CDP, with the closest access from Exit 284 (Old Pecos Trail),  to the north.

Demographics

Education
It is within Santa Fe Public Schools.

References 

Census-designated places in Santa Fe County, New Mexico
Census-designated places in New Mexico